Karl Yanovich Bauman (August 29, 1892 – October 14, 1937) was a Latvian-born Soviet politician and functionary of the Communist Party of the Soviet Union.

Early years
He was born in Viļķene Parish, Kreis Wolmar, Governorate of Livonia, Russian Empire to the family of a Latvian peasant; his father died while he was still young. 

After the revolution of 1905, he joined the Latvian Social Democratic Workers' Party (LSDSP), known at the time as the "Social-Democracy of the Latvian Territory", in 1907. He studied at the agricultural school in Pskov, but in 1908 he was arrested for illegal political activity and imprisoned. He also conducted illegal political work in Lemzale, Kyiv, and Saratov. He studied at the Kyiv Commercial Institute (1913-1916).

Soviet career
He participated in the October Revolution of 1917 in Kyiv. From December 14, 1920 to May 9, 1923 he was the executive secretary of the Kursk gubernatorial committee of the Russian Communist Party (Bolsheviks) ("RCP(b)"). He was also the chair of the Kursk provincial trade union council during this period.

In 1923-1924, he was deputy head of the Organizational and Instructor Department of the Central Committee of the RCP(b). In 1928 he was head of the Department for Rural Work of the Central Committee of the RCP(b), now named the All-Union Communist Party of Bolsheviks. He was one of the most zealous supporters of collectivization by any means.

From April 11, 1928 to February 4, 1932, he was a member of the Organizational Bureau of the Central Committee of the All-Union Communist Party of Bolsheviks; from April 29, 1929 to February 4, 1932 he was also Secretary of the Central Committee. During this time, from April 29, 1929 to June 26, 1930 he was a candidate member of the Politburo. He also was the first secretary of the Moscow Provincial Committee, then the Regional Committee of the All-Union Communist Party of Bolsheviks. In 1931-1934 he was the first secretary of the Central Asian Bureau of the Central Committee of the All-Union Communist Party of Bolsheviks. 

Bauman joined the Central Committee elected by the 17th Congress of the All-Union Communist Party (Bolsheviks) in 1934. In 1934-1937, he was the head of the Department of Scientific and Technical Inventions and Discoveries of the Central Committee of the All-Union Communist Party of Bolsheviks and the Planning, Financial and Trade Department of the Central Committee of the All-Union Communist Party of Bolsheviks.

Arrest, killing and rehabilitation
On April 14, 1937, he was removed from his post. He was arrested by the NKVD of the USSR on October 12, 1937 as a part of the so-called "Latvian Operation". He was immediately subjected to severe beatings, and two days after his arrest, killed in Lefortovo prison on October 14. There is only one document in the Bauman case, a statement written by him on the day of his death, covered in blood. 

After the death of Joseph Stalin in 1953, he was rehabilitated (posthumously exonerated) by the Chief Military Prosecutor's Office on July 15, 1955 and by the USSR Prosecutor's Office on June 23, 1989; on August 19, 1955, he was reinstated in the party.

References

1892 births
1937 deaths
People from Limbaži Municipality
People from Kreis Wolmar
Bolsheviks
Latvian communists
Politburo of the Central Committee of the Communist Party of the Soviet Union candidate members
Members of the Orgburo of the Central Committee of the Communist Party of the Soviet Union
All-Russian Central Executive Committee members
Central Executive Committee of the Soviet Union members
Latvian Operation of the NKVD
Great Purge victims from Latvia
People executed by the Soviet Union
Members of the Communist Party of the Soviet Union executed by the Soviet Union
Soviet rehabilitations